Sphenomorphus melanopogon is a species of skink found in Indonesia.

References

melanopogon
Reptiles of Indonesia
Reptiles described in 1839
Taxa named by André Marie Constant Duméril
Taxa named by Gabriel Bibron
Fauna of the Lesser Sunda Islands